Haja may refer to:

 Håja Najbudeen, the island in Hammerfest, Norway
 Haja, fictional character from the Japanese manga Rave Master
 Haja Afsatu Kabba (born 1953), politician
 Haja, an album released by The Adults in 2018

See also
 Hajja, a settlement in western coastal Morocco near Rabat